Stade du 26 Mars is located in the southern neighborhoods of Bamako, Mali. It serves as a home ground for domestic football club Stade Malien and is the national stadium. It has a capacity of 50,000 as an all-seater stadium. Built in 2001, it is named for the date of Martyrs' Day (Mali), a national commemoration of 26 March 1991 Bamako uprising which overthrew the dictatorship of Moussa Traoré. The stadium, which is built by China Overseas Engineering Group, served as a venue for 2002 African Cup of Nations.

References

External links
Photo at cafe.daum.net/stade
Photo at worldstadiums.com
Photos at fussballtempel.net

Football venues in Mali
Athletics (track and field) venues in Mali
Mali
Buildings and structures in Bamako
Djoliba AC
Stade Malien
Sports venues completed in 2001
2001 establishments in Mali